Syphacia is a genus of nematodes belonging to the family Oxyuridae.

The genus has cosmopolitan distribution.

Species:

Syphacia agraria 
Syphacia arvicolae 
Syphacia carlitosi 
Syphacia dewiae 
Syphacia emileromani
Syphacia evaginata 
Syphacia frederici 
Syphacia hodarae 
Syphacia kinsellai 
Syphacia kumis 
Syphacia montana 
Syphacia muris 
Syphacia nigeriana 
Syphacia niobe
Syphacia obvelata 
Syphacia ohtaorum
Syphacia oryzomyos 
Syphacia peromysci
Syphacia petrusewiczi 
Syphacia ratti 
Syphacia stroma 
Syphacia thompsoni 
Syphacia vanderbrueli 
Syphacia venteli

References

Nematodes